Stephen B. Roman was a Canadian bulk carrier operating on the Great Lakes owned by Lake Ontario Cement Company. The vessel was initially launched as Fort William in 1965 and owned and operated by Canada Steamship Lines. She carries dry cement to Great Lakes ports, and is named after prominent Canadian mining engineer Stephen Boleslav Roman. The ship was taken out of service in November 2018.

Description
The ship had a gross register tonnage (GRT) of 6,792 and a deadweight tonnage of 8,245.

Service history

The ship was ordered by Canada Steamship Lines (CSL) from Davie Shipbuilding for construction at the yard in Lauzon, Quebec with the yard number 652. Launched on April 24, 1965 as Fort William, the ship was completed in May 1965. Fort William, named for Fort William, Ontario, was initially a package freighter carrying ore pellets, the largest and last one constructed for Canada Steamship Lines. She capsized on September 14, 1965, due to human error when unloading at Montreal, Quebec. Her lower holds were emptied, while her upper decks were heavily loaded. Fort William was carrying 300 tons of calcium carbide which reacted with water to produce acetylene which then exploded. Five sailors were killed. The vessel was salvaged, taken to Davie Shipbuilding and restored to service in May 1966.

Fort William collided with the merchant vessel  on August 10, 1967. The two ships collided head-on in Lake Huron, with Fort William only slightly damaged while Paul L. Tietjen was holed in her bow. In 1976, the vessel was transferred to Power Corp of Canada Ltd. Fort William continued in uneventful service until December 17, 1977 when the ship ran aground in Maumee Bay at Toledo, Ohio. Two years later, on October 1, 1979, Fort William struck the Detroit River Light in fog. Fort Williams bow was damaged, and the ship was sent to Thunder Bay, Ontario for repairs at Port Arthur Shipyards.

Due to increased competition from other methods of transport for packaged goods Fort William was laid up at Hamilton, Ontario in 1981. The vessel was purchased in 1982 by the Lake Ontario Cement Company, now ESSROC Canada, which converted the ship to a self-unloading cement carrier. The ship was renamed Stephen B. Roman in 1983, named for a prominent Canadian mining engineer. In March 2007, the ship ran aground at the mouth of the Genesee River. The ship was unstuck, but silt build-up at the entrance to the port of Rochester, New York prevented the ship from entering. This led to 7,000 shipments of concrete by truck. In 2017, Stephen B. Roman was acquired by McKeil Marine. The purchase was announced on January 19, 2017.

Following her purchase, Stephen B. Roman was laid up in Toronto and remained alongside. Stephen B. Roman was the last of the Fairbanks-Morse-powered lakers and the final former CSL package freight fleet ship in service. In November 2018, the ship was officially taken out of service and sent to a scrapyard in Aliağa, Turkey.Stephen B. Roman was reflagged Saint Vincent and the Grenadines and sailed to Turkey under her own power. On December 18 the ship was beached to be broken up.

Citations

External links

Great Lakes freighters
1965 ships
Ships built in Quebec
Canada Steamship Lines